= St. Nicholas Church, Klenovskoye =

St. Nicholas Church
- Церковь Николая Чудотворца (Кленовское)
- Interactive map of the St. Nicholas Church area

General information
- Architectural style: Classicism
- Location: Klenovskoye
- Coordinates: 56°49′18″N 58°37′18″E
- Completed: 1842

Design and construction
- Architect: I. M. Podjachev

St. Nicholas Church is an Orthodox church in Klenovskoye village, Sverdlovsk oblast.

The church was granted the status of regional significance on 31 December 1987 (decision No. 535 by the executive committee of Sverdlovsk oblast Council of People's Deputies). The object number of cultural heritage of regional significance is 661610747140005.

== History ==
It is located on a hill in the central part of the village, next to the Siberian tract. Built and consecrated in the name of St. Nicholas in 1842. The building was closed in 1941. In 1987 received the status of a monument. Under the authority of the Russian Orthodox Church it was established in 1991. Since 1997, the reconstruction works.

== Architecture ==
The building is a model of Russian classicism, built on the project of Ivan Podyachev. The only, in volume-spatial composition, the rotundal building of the church in the Sverdlovsk region, represents the St. Petersburg architectural school.

To the round in terms of the temple part adjoin: in the direction from the east to the west a rectangular altar and a porch, in the direction from the north to the south four-columned porticoes of the Roman-Doric warrant. Similar porticos from the trehchetvertnyh columns make out an altar and a porch. Cylindrical temple volume crowns the dome on a low drum. Above the porch rose the bell tower, which harmoniously complemented the temple, its composition was based on the classic contrasting combination of longlines architecture. Above the rectangular volume of the first tier of ringing the second - cylindrical level rose, it was crowned by a slender spire. Facades in height are dissected by horizontal thrust, cut by rectangular and semicircular windows placed one above the other, completed with Doric frieze from triglyphs and metopes.

The leading theme for the organization of the temple interior was chosen arch. Large and small arches connect the wall pylons, cut through the walls. Together, the arches form a closed arcade, supporting a flat dome. On the walls of the church there are partially preserved murals.

== Literature ==
- В.Е.Звагельская, ed. (2008). Свод памятников истории и культуры Свердловской области. Vol. 2. Екатеринбург: Сократ. p. 648. ISBN 978-5-88664-323-7.
- Бурлакова Н.Н. (2011). Забытые храмы Свердловской области. Екатеринбург: Сократ. pp. 128–129. ISBN 978-5-88664-395-4.
